The froghead eel (Coloconger raniceps) is an eel in the family Colocongridae (worm eels/short-tail eels). It was described by Alfred William Alcock in 1889. It is a marine, deep-water dwelling eel which is known from the Indo-west Pacific, including East Africa, Madagascar, and southern Japan. It dwells at a depth range of 300–1134 metres. Males can reach a maximum total length of 50 centimetres.

References

Eels
Taxa named by Alfred William Alcock
Fish described in 1889